4-D (3,5-methoxy-4-trideuteromethoxyphenethylamine) is a lesser-known recreational psychedelic drug.  It is one of the few drugs that bears deuterium. It is a deuterated analog of mescaline. It may be prepared either as a sulfate salt or a hydrochloride salt.  4-D was first synthesized by Alexander Shulgin. In his book PiHKAL, the dosage is listed as approximately 200–400 mg for the sulfate salt, and 178–356 mg for the hydrochloride salt. 4-D lasts for approximately 12 hours. It causes closed-eye visuals, mild open-eye visuals, color distortion, and mydriasis.  Very little data exists about the pharmacological properties, metabolism, and toxicity of 4-D.

See also 
 beta-D, another deuterated phenethylamine

References

Mescalines
Deuterated compounds